Jenny Newstead is a 1932 melodramatic suspense novel by the British writer Marie Belloc Lowndes. It is based on the story of the serial killer George Joseph Smith.

References

Bibliography
 Vinson, James. Twentieth-Century Romance and Gothic Writers. Macmillan, 1982.

1932 British novels
Novels by Marie Belloc Lowndes
British thriller novels
Heinemann (publisher) books
G. P. Putnam's Sons books
Novels based on actual events